Russell Ward may refer to:
 Russell Ward (racing driver)
 Russell Ward (skeleton racer)

See also
 Russel Ward, Australian historian
 Ward Russell, American photographer and cinematographer